People on the Top (translit.Ahl el qema) is a 1981 Egyptian drama film directed by Ali Badrakhan. The film is listed in the Top 100 Egyptian films. It was selected as the Egyptian entry for the Best Foreign Language Film at the 54th Academy Awards, but was not accepted as a nominee. The film stars Soad Hosny and Nour El-Sherif.

Cast
 Soad Hosny
 Nour El-Sherif
 Ezzat El Alaili

See also
 Soad Hosny filmography
 CIFF Top 100 Egyptian films
 List of Egyptian films of the 1980s
 List of submissions to the 54th Academy Awards for Best Foreign Language Film
 List of Egyptian submissions for the Academy Award for Best Foreign Language Film

References

External links
 

1981 films
1981 drama films
Egyptian drama films
1980s Arabic-language films